Geoff Foster may refer to:
 Geoff Foster (audio engineer), English recording and mix engineer
 Geoff Foster (rugby league) (born 1952), Australian rugby league player
 Geoff Foster (politician) (born 1986), American politician in West Virginia

See also
 Jeff Foster (disambiguation)